This is a list of characters in the 1993 animated series, Animaniacs, and its 2020 revival.

The Warner Siblings (Animaniacs)
The Warner Siblings (also known as "the Animaniacs" by fans and the media) are small, silly, mischievous, anthropomorphic toon siblings of unknown origin and the central titular characters of the series; they generally introduce and identify themselves as "the Warner Brothers (and the Warner Sister)". Their species is never made clear: this has been satirized several times, most prominently in the song "What Are We?". While no writer or creator has confirmed the idea, Dot's name has implied that they may also be derived from "Warner Bros." itself: Yakko's position as their de facto leader can be symbolized as the prominence of "Warner", Wakko being the younger brother can be seen as the prominence of "Bros", and "Dot" may simply come from the period found at the end of the title of the company.

 Yakko (voiced by Rob Paulsen, occasional singing voice provided by Gabriel Mann in reboot) – Yakko is the wise-cracking, smart-and-fast-talking, oldest sibling—who usually acts as the leader of the trio. He’s the oldest sibling, at 14-years-old. He gets his name for his talkative nature being generalized as loquacious. As per his age and consequent obsession with girls, Yakko is responsible for most of the show's adult humor. He is inspired by Tom Ruegger's son Nathan, who also voices Skippy Squirrel.
 Wakko (voiced by Jess Harnell, belched by Maurice LaMarche, occasional singing voice provided by Brock Baker in reboot) – Wakko is the middle sibling, at 11-years-old, who has a huge appetite and magical "gag bag" full of tricks. He earns his name for being the most outrageous in physical comedy—and supposedly the least intelligent—though Yakko has claimed it to be "middle kid syndrome" in the episode "Survey Ladies". He also has a Scouse/Liverpool dialect inspired by The Beatles.
 Dot (voiced by Tress MacNeille, occasional singing voice provided by Missi Hale in reboot) – Dot is the youngest sibling at 10-years-old, and only sister. She is more easily relaxed than her brothers, but proves on numerous occasions that she can be just as wild as they are. Her full name is Princess Angelina Contessa Louisa Francesca Banana Fanna Bo Besca III; she also despises being referred to as "Dottie", threatening anyone who does so with death. She is said to be both a tomboy and feminine.

Supporting characters
 Dr. Otto von Scratchansniff (voiced by Rob Paulsen) – A WB studio psychiatrist, who attempts to force the Warner siblings to be "less zany". He often loses patience with the Warner kids and has an outburst of frustration—his first chronological interaction with them sees him pulling out his hair until he achieved his characteristic baldness—but then becomes fonder of and takes more responsibility for them as the series progressed, occasionally acting as a father figure; the Warner siblings are clearly shown to be annoying him on purpose, but are also very fond of him.
 Hello Nurse (voiced by Tress MacNeille) – A buxom blonde WB studio nurse over whom various males—particularly the Warner Bros, Yakko and Wakko—fawn. Her appearance usually prompts the Warner brothers into affectionate greeting of "Hellooooooo, nurse!" occasionally accompanied by leaping into her arms or big kisses, although sometimes any number of all three WB siblings use the same gag on other characters. Hello Nurse appears in a few Slappy cartoons as a running gag. In Wakko's Wish, it is revealed that she has an IQ of 192, but is primarily respected for her looks and not her mind. The phrase "Hellooooooo, nurse!" was initially meant to be a catchphrase for Buster Bunny on Tiny Toon Adventures as a counterpart for Bugs Bunny's "Eh, what's up, Doc?", but the writers could not find an appropriate way for him to use the phrase organically; of course, the phrase did not originate there, having been used decades earlier in vaudeville shows. Creator Tom Ruegger shared on Twitter that the character's name is Heloise Nerz and she has German heritage. The era of the revival would deem Hello Nurse inappropriate, and so she is fully absent, with Dr. Scratchansniff providing the in-universe explanation of her joining Doctors Without Borders in the intervening two decades.
 Ralph T. Guard (voiced by Frank Welker) – A dim-witted WB Studios security guard who is usually the one to recapture the Warner siblings and confine them to the Warner Bros. tower. He first appeared in Tiny Toon Adventures as the Fat Guard. Despite retaining his stupidity in the revival, he takes advantage of the Warner's lack of 21st century technology to contain them briefly. In the season 2 finale, he is revealed to be related to Nora Rita Norita and his real name is Ralphnazo.
 Thaddeus Plotz (voiced by Frank Welker) – A squat, hot-tempered, money-grubbing CEO of Warner Bros., whose portrait is a prominent decoration of the CEO's office. He is not present in the reboot (except in the two-part "Wakkiver Twist"), as he has left his position at Warner Bros. sometime during the Warners' 22-year period of absence.
 Nora Rita Norita (voiced by Stephanie Escajeda) – Plotz's successor in the revival. Though as stern and short-tempered as Plotz, she takes the Warners' zaniness more passively; she is also obsessed with her health so as to maintain her slender frame.
 Nils Neidhart (voiced by Fred Tatasciore) – An immensely muscular, narcissistic, and vindictive Liechtensteiner athlete with a massive ego. He prides himself on his muscles and laughs off those he assumes to be weaker than him. However, after the Warners outsmart him, he literally ends up trapped in Hell.

Pinky and the Brain

Pinky and the Brain are two anthropomorphic white mice kept in a cage at ACME Labs, voiced by Rob Paulsen and Maurice LaMarche, respectively. The Brain is serious and devious, the leader, and constantly devising plans to conquer the world. He resembles and sounds like Orson Welles. Pinky is eccentric and unintelligent but loyal to the Brain. In 1995, they were spun off into a cartoon series of their own. As of now, they are the only non-Warner Siblings segment to regularly appear in the 2020 revival series where Brain appears as more villainous. The revival revealed that the reason why Brain wants to take over the world is that he was frustrated and angered by how the scientists mistreated him when they demonstrated his helplessness during his youth, and since then, he vowed that he would be in control of what happens around him.

Supporting characters
 Billie (voiced by Tress MacNeille) – A anthropomorphic female white mouse, who appeared in "The World Can Wait", "Brain Noir" and "You'll Never Eat Food Pellets In This Town Again!".
 Pharfignewton (voiced by Rob Paulsen and Frank Welker) – A female white racehorse who Pinky fawns over. Her name refers to Phar Lap, Fig Newtons and Fahrvergnügen, the last an advertising slogan used by Volkswagen. Unlike most other animal characters from Animaniacs, she does not have any anthropomorphic traits.
 Julia (voiced by Maria Bamford) – A female, genetically altered, anthropomorphic lab mouse and ex-wife of the Brain, who appears in the 2020 revival, first appearing in "Mousechurian Candidate". She was mutated by Brain using the DNA found on artifacts of past First Ladies of the United States to be his candidate for the position as he attempts to run for president. However, the public finds her more favorable and write her in instead, and Julia then defies Brain's schemes after finding them immoral. During a presidential debate in Nashua, New Hampshire, Brain attempts to control her using a neural implant in her left ear, but she overcomes his control through her own will. However, she cannot remove the malfunctioning device, which continuously gives her electric shocks. This gradually drives her insane, causing her to desire revenge and want to take over the world for herself.
Snowball (voiced by Roddy McDowall) – An anthropomorphic lab hamster and Brain's former childhood friend-turned-rival who was also made intelligent by gene splicing and has a similar desire for world conquest (though his desire is far more malevolent than Brain's) which Pinky and Brain are sometimes forced to stop.
 Larry (voiced by Billy West) – An anthropomorphic white mouse created as a response to demands from Kids' WB executives to include additional characters on the show. His presence is sporadic, as the writers of the show believed that including an additional character would ruin the chemistry between Pinky and Brain, as they worked best as a comedy duo; thus a third character would, therefore, be out of place and unnecessary to the plot. To further drive this point home, Larry's first appearance was marked by a modified version of the theme song with the words "and Larry!" shoehorned in between existing lyrics. He is a caricature of Larry Fine of The Three Stooges fame; therefore, the episode's title is "Pinky and the Brain...and Larry". He later makes a brief cameo in the Animaniacs revival series segment "The Flawed Couple", appearing in the title sequence of Narfs, a parody of Cheers.
Elmyra Duff (voiced by Cree Summer)  – A redheaded girl who became Pinky and the Brain's owner in Pinky, Elmyra & the Brain. She originated from Tiny Toon Adventures.
Precious (voiced by Nora Dunn) 
Pinky's Parents (voiced by Eric Idle)
Brain's Parents (voiced by Ernest Borgnine and Tress MacNeille) 
Romy (voiced by Rob Paulsen (adult) and Maurice LaMarche (young)

The Goodfeathers
The Goodfeathers are an Italian American trio of anthropomorphic pigeons: Squit (gray), Bobby (turquoise), and Pesto (lavender), who were voiced by Maurice LaMarche, John Mariano and Chick Vennera, influenced by Ray Liotta, Robert De Niro, and Joe Pesci's roles in Goodfellas.

Supporting characters
 The Godpigeon (voiced by Chick Vennera) – An anthropomorphic pigeon and parody of Vito Corleone in The Godfather. He is usually unintelligble and has to be translated by Bobby.
 The Girlfeathers are a trio of anthropomorphic doves and their girlfriends. Sasha (voiced by Tress MacNeille) is Squit's girlfriend and Pesto's equally hot-tempered sister. Lana (voiced by Gail Matthius) is Bobby's girlfriend, a parody of Cathy Moriarty's character in Raging Bull. Kiki (voiced by MacNeille), is Pesto's girlfriend and a stereotypical dumb blonde.
 Pipsqueak (voiced by Gabriel Luque) – A tiny anthropomorphic great horned owl.
 Ma (voiced by Lainie Kazan) – A anthropomorphic dove and Pesto and Sasha's mother, who lives in Miami Beach, Florida.
 Steven Seagull (voiced by David Kaufman) – A anthropomorphic seagull and Pesto and Sasha's stepfather, a parody of Steven Seagal.

Slappy and Skippy Squirrel
 Slappy Squirrel (voiced by Sherri Stoner) – A female anthropomorphic squirrel and a grumpy old cartoon veteran, who lives in a tree with her nephew Skippy Squirrel. The music played in some of her segments is from Antonín Dvořák's "Humoresque No. 7."
 Skippy Squirrel (voiced by Nathan Ruegger) – An anthropomorphic squirrel and Slappy's grand-nephew, whose chipper personality is the opposite of his aunt's. His character varies from slightly naive to innocent to being a complicit partner of Slappy.

Supporting characters
 Walter Wolf (voiced by Frank Welker in his first appearance and Jess Harnell for the remainder of the series) – An anthropomorphic wolf and Slappy Squirrel's longtime nemesis. He is a parody of the Big Bad Wolf characters of Disney and Tex Avery fame.
 Stephen Wolf (voiced by John P. McCann) - An anthropomorphic wolf and Walter's grandson, who appears in "...And Justice For Slappy". In the episode, he acted as Walter's attorney as part of Walter's plot to finally turn the table on Slappy as revenge for years of torment by her by putting her on trial for supposedly "assaulting him with a intent to squash" (even though he was the one who assaulted her first). However, Walter's plans eventually fail when Slappy is found innocent. As a result, he brutally attacks his own grandson.
 Sid the Squid (voiced by Jack Burns) – An anthropomorphic squid villain similar to Chuck Jones' version of Daffy Duck.
 Beanie the Brain-Dead Bison (voiced by Avery Schreiber) – An anthropomorphic bison villain similar to Pete Puma.
 Stinkbomb D. Bassett (voiced by Jonathan Winters) – An anthropomorphic basset hound and foe of Slappy, who appears in "Smell Ya Later".
 Bumpo Bassett (voiced by Luke Ruegger) – An anthropomorphic basset hound and Stinkbomb's grandson, who also appears in "Smell Ya Later".
 Candie Chipmunk (voiced by Gail Matthius) – A female anthropomorphic chipmunk and Slappy's self-centered neighbour, who appears in "I Got Yer Can". An excerpt of the "Dance of the Reed Flutes", from Tchaikovsky's Nutcracker Suite, plays whenever she appears.
 Codger Eggbert (voiced by Chuck McCann in "Critical Condition" and Billy West in "Hurray for North Hollywood") – A parody of Roger Ebert.
 Lene Hisskill (voiced by Maurice LaMarche) – A parody of Gene Siskel, who appears in "Critical Condition".
 Doug the Dog (voiced by Frank Welker) – A large anthropomorphic bulldog villain, who appears in "Slappy Goes Walnuts".
 Vina Walleen (voiced by Tress MacNeille) – A female anthropomorphic deer and old friend of Slappy, who appears in "Bumbie's Mom".
 Daniel Boone (voiced by Jim Cummings) – The self-proclaimed "best frontiersman that ever lived", who appears in "Frontier Slappy".
 Duke (voiced by Corey Burton) – A school bully, who appears in "Bully for Skippy".
 Ms. Butley (voiced by Tress MacNeille) – Skippy's guidance counselor, who appears in "Bully for Skippy".
 Reef Blunt (voiced by Rob Paulsen) – Chairman of the Federal Television Agency, who appears in "Bully for Skippy". He wanted everyone involved in children's television to follow the new strict guidelines, which includes decreasing amounts of cartoon violence and increasing education for three hours each day, much to the misery of Yakko and Slappy.

Rita and Runt
These segments, along with "Minerva Mink", were discontinued at the end of Season 1 (in part, because of Bernadette Peters' salary). Welker remained a series regular, voicing other characters. Rita and Runt returned as minor characters toward the series' end, and also appeared in the feature-length direct-to-video animated film Animaniacs: Wakko's Wish.

Rita and Runt are a vagabond stray duo that get into many scraps and adventures. They are often searching for a home, but are back as strays by the end of the episode. In Animaniacs: Wakko's Wish, they are shown finally being accepted into a home, a result of Wakko's wish for two ha'pennies, which caused several characters to receive their heart's desires.

 Rita (voiced by Bernadette Peters) – A sarcastic, aloof and intelligent cat that sings. She also has various anthropomorphic traits.
 Runt (voiced by Frank Welker) – A dim-witted dog who thinks that Rita is also a dog like himself and who constantly uses the word "definitely" when speaking. This verbal tic, as well as Runt's speaking style, is a reference to Dustin Hoffman's character in Rain Man. He also has a few anthropomorphic traits, even though these are rarely shown.

Supporting characters
 Dr. Phrankenstein (voiced by Adrienne Alexander) – A stumpy female mad scientist, who appears in "Phranken-Runt".
 Scout (voiced by Frank Welker) – Dr. Phrankenstein's dog-like creation, who appears in "Phranken-Runt".
 Mr. Squeak – Dr. Phrankenstein's pet rat, who appears in "Phranken-Runt".
 Mrs. Mumphead (voiced by Paul Rugg) – An eccentric old lady, who appears in "No Place Like Homeless".
 Crackers (voiced by Frank Welker) – Mrs. Mumphead's pet parrot, who appears in "No Place Like Homeless".
 Kiki – An ill-tempered gorilla, who appears in "Kiki's Kitten".
 Mr. Politician (voiced by Frank Welker) – A parody of Ross Perot, who appears in "Icebreakers".
 Missy "Ma" McCoy (voiced by Tress MacNeille) – An elderly farm cat, who appears in "Up a Tree"

Buttons and Mindy
Buttons is a German Shepherd Dog who watches Mindy when her parents are away. He also has some rarely shown anthropomorphic traits. His vocal effects are provided by Frank Welker. Mindy, voiced by Nancy Cartwright, is a young girl who constantly wanders into trouble without even being aware of it. Buttons haplessly struggles with various dangers and narrowly rescues Mindy, only to be blamed and punished for her misbehavior. There is no consistency or continuity in the storytelling; most episodes each feature Mindy's family living in a different setting and portraying them as different sorts of people. In Animaniacs: Wakko's Wish, Buttons is rewarded with some good steak instead of being punished.

Supporting characters
 Mindy's Mother (voiced by Tress MacNeille) – In brief off-camera appearances, her face is never shown and she is usually called "Lady" by Mindy in the series; in Animaniacs: Wakko's Wish, Mindy finally calls her "Mom".
 Mindy's Father (voiced by Frank Welker) – His face is also never shown; Mindy usually calls him "Mr. Man".

Katie Ka-Boom
Katie Ka-Boom is a teenage girl voiced by Laura Mooney, who morphs into various violent, destructive monsters when things do not go her way. She lives with her parents and her little brother named Tinker. Writer Nicholas Hollander based Katie on his own daughter, who, at the time, was going through a similar tantrum phase.

In the reboot episode "Good Warner Hunting", Katie is seen with the previous cartoon characters and her appearance suggests that she is now an adult.

Supporting characters
 Tinker Ka-Boom (voiced by Justin Garms) – Katie's little brother, who is five years old and in kindergarten. He wears a blue shirt and red hat like Wakko.
 Mr. and Mrs. Ka-Boom (voiced by Rob Paulsen and Mary Gross respectively) – Katie's parents. Mr. Ka-Boom's voice and appearance are modeled after Jimmy Stewart.
 Jared (voiced by Eric Balfour) - Katie's boyfriend.

Minerva Mink
Minerva Mink is an attractive young anthropomorphic mink, voiced by Julie Brown, who was called Marilyn Mink in pre-production.

Supporting characters
Newt (voiced by Arte Johnson) – A faithful anthropomorphic dachshund who appears in "Puttin' on the Blitz".
Wilford B. Wolf (voiced by Peter Scolari) – An anthropomorphic nerdy wolf who becomes a handsome werewolf every full moon. His werewolf alter-ego is similar in appearance to a Chippendales dancer and very affectionate to Minerva. Minerva once asked him about his werewolf changes and when will the next full moon come, Wilford answers that it comes every 28 days, to which she implied "Good things are worth waiting for."

The Hip Hippos
Flavio and Marita, also more commonly known as the Hip Hippos, are a wealthy, Spanish, anthropomorphic hippo couple voiced by Frank Welker and Tress MacNeille (singing voices done by Wendy Knudsen for Marita and Ray McLeod for Flavio).

Supporting characters
Dr. Gina Embryo (voiced by Tress MacNeille) – A human zoologist who studies the Hip Hippos and tries in vain to protect them, a parody of both Joan Embery and Jane Goodall.
The Maid (voiced by Tress MacNeille) - The Hip Hippos' anthropomorphic giraffe maid who appears in "La Behemoth".
The Punishing Petersons (voiced by Jim Cummings and Tress MacNeille) - A super athletic and highly competitive couple, who first appears in "Amazing Gladiators" as competitors on the titular show (a parody of American Gladiators).

Guest characters
 Mr. Director (voiced by Paul Rugg) – A recurring character who is a caricature of Jerry Lewis who always speaks in a whiney childish-like tone, and often shouts out nonsensical words like "Flamiel", or "Freunlaven".
 Miss Flamiel (voiced by Tress MacNeille) – The studio's strict teacher who Plotz hired as a way to control the Warner siblings' behavior (which obviously failed). Whenever someone does something wrong or incorrect in front of her, she gets out a red marker (black in Wakko's case to accommodate his red hat) and writes "F" on their forehead, as shown in "Chalkboard Bungle". In other episodes, she is less strict, while the Warners are cooperative as shown in "Wakko's America" where she hosts a game of Jeopardy!, and Wakko, who lands the Daily Double, wagers all of his money to name all 50 states and capitals. Wakko does so, but fails because he answers in the form of a song and not a question.
 The Little Blue Bird (voiced by Cody Ruegger) – A young bluebird with anthropomorphic traits. He debuts in the one-shot cartoon "Wild Blue Yonder", believing a stealth bomber to be his mother.
 Chicken Boo (voiced by Frank Welker) – A six-foot-tall chicken who wishes to live as a human, so he wears flimsy disguises, usually just a hat or a coat, which somehow always fool everyone – except for one person whom no one believes. Unlike other animal characters, Boo cannot talk and acts almost exactly like a real chicken, making his disguises all the more absurd. At the end of each episode, his disguise falls apart, and he is exposed as a giant chicken. This causes all of his previous supporters to turn against him (after the person who was originally not believed says "I told you that guy was a chicken!") and usually run him out of town. In the revival, it's revealed that in the years since the original show's end, he has greatly improved his disguising ability to the point that he can legitimately appear as a human, even being able to speak English when disguised. However, he was apparently not supposed to appear in the revival as he was, according to the Warners, the least popular character in the show. Boo disguised himself as a hunter named Walter Grubb and hunted down most of the original cast of Animaniacs in revenge and supposedly killed them and tried to hunt the Warners as well until they tricked him into removing his disguise and exposing his identity, and the rest of the original cast of Animaniacs were later revealed to all be alive, freed by the Warners, and chase Boo with the intention to attack him.
Steven Spielberg (voiced by Frank Welker in the original, Andy Milder in the revival) – The show's executive producer, often mentioned by the cast, although he has made a small amount of physical appearances. These include an appearance as "His Eminence" in "Hooked on a Ceiling."
 Colin (the Randy Beaman Kid) (voiced by Colin Wells) – A wide-eyed boy who tells improbable stories which allegedly happened to his (never-seen) friend Randy Beaman. He comes out of his home with an object in hand that he fidgets with while he tells the story (the object is usually not related to the story) and starts off with "One time...okay, see, one time..." and then tells his story while playing with whatever he has. When he is finished, something will usually happen to the object that he is playing with (like an ice cream cone melting or a baseball going through someone's window), and the kid will finish with "'kay, bye.", then turn around and walk back into his house.
 The Flame (voiced by Luke Ruegger) – A talking childlike candle flame, who is present at important historical events and teaches fire safety.
 Charlton "Baynarts" Woodchuck (voiced by Jeff Bennett) – An anthropomorphic woodchuck and cartoon director from Kansas.
 Mr. Skullhead – A mute skeleton seen in the "Good Idea-Bad Idea" segment narrated by Tom Bodett and a parody of Edward Scissorhands. Initially introduced on Tiny Toon Adventures as a creation of Elmyra, based on the little skull in her bow.
 The Mime – A nameless and accident-prone mime who appears in "Mime Time", also narrated by Bodett.
 Mary Hartless (voiced by Valri Bromfield and Tress MacNeille)– A parody of Mary Hart, who appears as a newsreader with a variety of hairstyles. She was initially introduced on Tiny Toon Adventures.
 Death – A reaper with a black robe, skeletal appearance and scythe. In "Meatballs or Consequences" the Warner siblings challenge him to a game of checkers, reminiscent of the chess game with Death in Ingmar Bergman's 1956 The Seventh Seal.
 The Narrator (voiced by Jim Cummings) – The offscreen narrator of several episodes. A variant of this narrator, voiced by Tom Bodett, appears during the "Good Idea-Bad Idea" and "Mime Time" segments. Another variant of this narrator, voiced by Frank Welker, appears in various cartoon segments, such as "Newsreel of the Stars", "Turkey Jerky" and "The Warners' 65th Anniversary Special". 
 Francis "Pip" Pumphandle (voiced by Ben Stein) – A man who tells long and boring stories and bores the Warners in "Chairman of the Bored". He also appears in the Pinky and the Brain episode "Star Warners", and returns in Animaniacs: Wakko's Wish as a fairy-like Desire Fulfillment Facilitator.
 Bugs Bunny (voiced by Greg Burson) – An anthropomorphic wisecracking, carrot-loving rabbit and one of the biggest cartoon stars at the Warner Bros. studio.
 Daffy Duck (voiced by Greg Burson in the original, Eric Bauza in the revival) – An anthropomorphic greedy, self-centered duck and one of the biggest cartoon stars at the Warner Bros. studio.
 Starbox and Cindy (voiced by Danny Jacobs and Eleanor Johnson, respectively) – Starbox is a miniature alien whose job is to press a button to signal a hostile takeover of Earth. Unfortunately, he is captured by a kind-hearted girl named Cindy who plays with him and talks of nonsensical and slightly surreal things; as a result, the invasion is put on indefinite hold. The voice acting suggests that most of Cindy's dialogue is taken from Johnson's legitimate conversations with animation placed over it.
 The Incredible Gnome in People's Mouths (voiced by John DiMaggio) – Once a narcissistic CEO, he has been transformed into a rage-driven gnome who goes inside people's mouths and tells others what they really think; comically popping out to scream. Once his job is done, he walks off into the sunset, a lá The Incredible Hulk.
 Freakazoid (voiced by Paul Rugg) – An insane teenage superhero and titular protagonist of the show of the same name. He cameos in "This Pun for Hire" and "The Big Wrap Party Tonight". He was originally set to appear in the 2020 revival, but this fell through due to Rugg being unavailable.
 The Munch-Man (voiced by Shah Rukh Khan) - A man who loves to eat everything in The World.
 Cora Norita (voiced by Chrissie Fit) - Nora's grouchy teenage daughter.

References

 
1990s television-related lists
Child characters in television
Child characters in animated television series
Lists of characters in American television animation
Lists of children's television characters